The McCracken Brothers Motor Freight Building, located in Eugene, Oregon, is listed on the National Register of Historic Places.

See also
 National Register of Historic Places listings in Lane County, Oregon

References

National Register of Historic Places in Eugene, Oregon